Ninoslav Milenković (Serbian Cyrillic: Нинослав Миленковић; born December 31, 1977, in Subotica, SFR Yugoslavia) is a Bosnian retired footballer who last played for Panserraikos.

Club career
On the club level, before coming to China, Ninoslav Milenković was active for FK Mladost Lučani and FK Hajduk Kula in Serbia, B36 Tórshavn in the Faroe Islands, Sint-Truidense, Germinal Beerschot, K. Lierse S.K. in the Belgian First Division, FK Leotar Trebinje and FK Sarajevo in the Bosnian-Herzegovinian Premier League, Dynamo Dresden in Germany, Panserraikos F.C. in Greece and Enosis Neon Paralimni FC in Cyprus.

He transferred to Qingdao Jonoon in July 2010.

International career
He made his debut for Bosnia and Herzegovina in a February 2004 friendly match away against Macedonia and has earned a total of 15 caps, scoring no goals. Milenković played 7 games out of a possible 10 in 2006 FIFA World Cup qualification. His final international was a September 2006 European Championship qualification match against Hungary.

References

External links
 weltfussball  
 

1977 births
Living people
Sportspeople from Subotica
Association football central defenders
Bosnia and Herzegovina footballers
Bosnia and Herzegovina international footballers
FK Mladost Lučani players
B36 Tórshavn players
Dynamo Dresden players
TGM SV Jügesheim players
FK Hajduk Kula players
FK Leotar players
Lierse S.K. players
Beerschot A.C. players
Sint-Truidense V.V. players
FK Sarajevo players
Panserraikos F.C. players
Enosis Neon Paralimni FC players
Qingdao Hainiu F.C. (1990) players
NK Istra 1961 players
Doxa Drama F.C. players
First League of Serbia and Montenegro players
Faroe Islands Premier League players
Regionalliga players
Oberliga (football) players
Premier League of Bosnia and Herzegovina players
Belgian Pro League players
Super League Greece players
Cypriot First Division players
Chinese Super League players
Croatian Football League players
Football League (Greece) players
Gamma Ethniki players
Bosnia and Herzegovina expatriate footballers
Expatriate footballers in Serbia and Montenegro
Bosnia and Herzegovina expatriate sportspeople in Serbia and Montenegro
Expatriate footballers in the Faroe Islands
Bosnia and Herzegovina expatriate sportspeople in the Faroe Islands
Expatriate footballers in Germany
Bosnia and Herzegovina expatriate sportspeople in Germany
Expatriate footballers in Belgium
Bosnia and Herzegovina expatriate sportspeople in Belgium
Expatriate footballers in Greece
Bosnia and Herzegovina expatriate sportspeople in Greece
Expatriate footballers in Cyprus
Bosnia and Herzegovina expatriate sportspeople in Cyprus
Expatriate footballers in China
Bosnia and Herzegovina expatriate sportspeople in China
Expatriate footballers in Croatia
Bosnia and Herzegovina expatriate sportspeople in Croatia